Federico Todeschini (born August 8, 1975 in Rosario) is an Argentine rugby union footballer. He has played for several teams in Argentina, Italy and France, he has also represented the Argentina national rugby union team on several occasions since 1998.

Career
Todeschini started his career in Argentina with Atlético del Rosario, where he won two national championships in 1996 and 2000.

He has played for several clubs in Europe.

Todeschini was named as man of the match in the famous 25-18 defeat of England at Twickenham on November 11, 2006.

References

External links
 
 UAR profile

1975 births
Sportspeople from Rosario, Santa Fe
Argentine rugby union players
Living people
Rugby union fullbacks
Montpellier Hérault Rugby players
Argentina international rugby union players
Argentine expatriate sportspeople in Italy
Argentine expatriate sportspeople in France
FC Grenoble players
Expatriate rugby union players in France
Expatriate rugby union players in Italy
AS Béziers Hérault players
Stade Rochelais players
CA Bordeaux-Bègles Gironde players